Simo Nurminen (born 2 January 1949) is a Finnish orienteering competitor. He received two bronze medals at the 1978 World Orienteering Championships in Kongsberg, one in the individual contest and one in the relay with the Finnish team.

See also
 Finnish orienteers
 List of orienteers
 List of orienteering events

References

1949 births
Living people
Finnish orienteers
Male orienteers
Foot orienteers
World Orienteering Championships medalists